This is a list of fictional sports teams, athletic groups that have been identified by name in works of fiction but do not really exist as such. Teams have been organized by the sport they participate in, followed by the media product they appear in. Specific television episodes are noted when available.

Baseball teams
 Albany Senators – Cold Case episode The Brush Man
 Atlanta Hawks – For Love of the Game by Michael Shaara and For Love of the Game (film)
 The Bad News Bears
 Baltimore Nordiques- Pinky and the Brain 
 Bay City Bluebirds – Bay City Blues
 Bedrock Boulders – The Flintstones
 The Bingo Long Traveling All-Stars & Motor Kings – The Bingo Long Traveling All-Stars & Motor Kings by William Brashler
 Blattsville Millstones – Will & Grace
 Boston Boomers- Rugrats
 Brooklyn Bimbos – Pride of the Bimbos by John Sayles
 Capital Congressmen – Fallout 3
 California Stars – The Greatest American Hero
 Chester Gap Homebrews – If OJ, Michael Craft, and Patricia Ramsey Did It by Craig Gilmore
 Chicago Charcoal Kings – The Bingo Long Traveling All-Stars & Motor Kings
 Coast City Angels – Green Lantern
 Cougarettes – Odditorium by Hob Broun
 Crandall Giants – Child's Play by Sal Conte
 Creepy Hollow Vampires – Stranger City Caper by Ross H. Spencer
 The Electabuzz – Pokémon
 Enid Eagles – The House of Daniel by Harry Turtledove
 Graceville Oilers – Long Gone by Paul Hemphill
 Grandview High School Tigers – Ghost Whisperer
 Grizzly Gulch No Soxs – Kirby's Last Circus by Ross H. Spencer
 The Gypsy Moths – Be Cool, Scooby-Doo!
 Hackensack Bulls – Brewster's Millions (1985 film)
 Hadley Saints – Winter Always Comes by Donald Honig
 Highbridge Hellbenders – Brittle Innings by Michael Bishop
 Hoboken Zephyrs – The Twilight Zone
 Hollywood Stars – The Cheat by Pat Jordan
 Holyoke Redwings – The Spoiler by Domenic Stansberry
Hope County Cougars – Far Cry 5
 House of Daniel – The House of Daniel by Harry Turtledove
 Kansas City Regents – The House of Daniel by Harry Turtledove
 Kelly's Corner Shillelagh – Kirby's Last Circus by Ross H. Spencer
 The Magikarp – Pokémon
 Miami Gators – Back to the Future Part II
 Morristown Frackers - Brockmire
 Mudville Nine – Casey at the Bat
 Myrtle Beach Mermen – Eastbound & Down
 Neptune Pirates – Veronica Mars
 New Orleans Pelicans – Knave of Eagles by Robert Wade
 New York Americans – Squeeze Play by Paul Benjamin
 New York Bombers – The Horse That Played Center Field by Hal Higdon
 New York Empires – Clubhouse (TV series)
 New York Empires – Take Me Out (play)
 New York Goats – The Horse That Played Center Field by Hal Higdon
 New York Hilltoppers – The House of Daniel by Harry Turtledove
 New York Knights – The Natural
 New York Lions – The Last Great Season by Donald Honig
 New York Loons – Rhubarb by H. Allen Smith
 New York Mammoths – Bang the Drum Slowly
 New York Nats – Toot-Toot-Tootsie Good-Bye by Ron Powers
 O-Town Zeros – Rocko's Modern Life
 Pittsburgh Crawdads – The House of Daniel by Harry Turtledove 
 Pittsburgh Pythons – The Horse That Played Center Field by Hal Higdon
 Quahog Whooping Scalpers- Family Guy The Movement
 Rockingham Ruckus - Eastbound & Down
 Roswell Greys - The Unnatural (The X-Files)
 St. Louis Archdeacons – The House of Daniel by Harry Turtledove
 St. Louis Birds – The Horse That Played Center Field by Hal Higdon
 St. Louis Ebony Aces – The Bingo Long Traveling All-Stars & Motor Kings
 St. Louis Wolves – Who's on First? by Abbott and Costello
 San Francisco Owls – The Horse That Played Center Field by Hal Higdon
 San Francisco Saints – Monk (TV series)
 Santa Barbara Seabirds – Psych
 Santa Destroy Warriors – No More Heroes
 Scappers – Home Run Hero and others by Dean Hughes
 South Avenue Rovers – Things Invisible To See by Nancy Willard
 Springfield Isotopes – The Simpsons by The Simpsons
 The Starmie – Pokémon
 Sticks – Guys Like Us by Tom Lorenz
 Stoned Lightning – Achewood by Chris Onstad
 Stoolbend Turtleheads – The Cleveland Show
 Stranger City Strangers – Stranger City Caper by Ross H. Spencer
 Sweetwheat Sweethearts – The Sweetheart Season by Karen Joy Fowler
 Tampico Stogies – Long Gone
 Valley Falls High School – Chip Hilton series by Clair Bee
 Wonderdogs – Bob's Burgers

A League of Their Own
 Lukash Dairy
 Peekskill Parks
 Staten Island Stevedores

Baseball Stars series

Baseball Stars/Baseball Stars Professional
American Dreams
Japan Robins
Brave Warriors
Ninja Blacksox
World Powers
Ghastly Monsters
Lovely Ladies
SNK Crushers
Fabulous Superstars
Battle Knights
Shadow Demons
Heavenly Bodies
Celestial Planets
Comic Astroboys
Wild Flowers
Creative Brains

Baseball Stars 2
New York Monsters
USA Bisons
Tokyo Ninjas
Japan Samurais
Napoli Angels
Italian Waves
Taipei Hawks
Taiwan Dragons
Seoul Ivorys
Korean Red Vipers
Sydney Griffons
Aussie Thunders

BASEketball teams
BASEketball is a mix of baseball and basketball played in the 1998 movie of the same name.
 Atlanta Plantations
 Baltimore Burners
 Boston Mobsters
 Buffalo Bums
 Charlotte Biscuits
 Dallas Felons
 Denver Cavemen
 Detroit Lemons
 Los Angeles Riots
 Miami Dealers
 Milwaukee Beers
 New Jersey Informants
 Oakland Bandits
 Pittsburgh Factories
 Roswell Aliens
 San Antonio Defenders
 San Diego Whalers
 San Francisco Ferries
 Toronto Sorrys

Batman
 Gotham Goliaths (comic book)
 Gotham Knights (comic book) 
 Gotham City Eagles (1966 TV series)
 Motor City Wheels (1966 TV series)
 The Pets (no city given, 1966 TV series)
 Windy City Wildcats (1966 TV series)

Beanball: Murder at the World Series by Tom Seaver
 Brooklyn Bandits
 Jersey Boomers

Benchwarmers
 The Benchwarmers
 Wayne's Hardware

Blernsball teams
Blernsball is the version of baseball in the year 3000 in the show Futurama
Boston Poindexters
Mars Greenskins
New New York Mets
New New York Yankees
Pituitary Giants
Swedish Meatballs
Atlanta Braves

Blockade Billy by Stephen King
 New Jersey Titans

Grand Theft Auto (series)
 Las Venturas Bandits – Grand Theft Auto: San Andreas
 Liberty City Swingers – Grand Theft Auto IV
 Los Santos Saints – Grand Theft Auto: San Andreas
 San Fierro Packers – Grand Theft Auto: San Andreas
 Liberty City Cocks – Grand Theft Auto III
 Boars Baseball Club – Grand Theft Auto V
 Feud Baseball Team – Grand Theft Auto V
 Los Santos Corkers – Grand Theft Auto V
 Los Santos Squeezers – Grand Theft Auto V

Philip Roth's The Great American Novel
Aceldama Butchers
Asylum Keepers
Independence Blues
Kakoola Reapers
Ruppert Mundys
Terra Incognita Rustlers
Tri-City Greenbacks
Tri-City Tycoons

Hardball (1994 TV series)
 California Pioneers
 New Jersey Pioneers

Looney Tunes
 Gas House Gorillas
 Tea Totalers

The Man Who Brought the Dodgers Back to Brooklyn by David Ritz
 Los Angeles Stars
 Miami SunKings
 Tucson Sunbelters

Noonan: A Novel About Baseball, Esp, and Time Warps by Leonard Everett Fisher
 Brooklyn Dutchmen
 Providence Preachers
 Spartans

Pinky and the Brain
 New Hampshire Pineapples
 San Jose Malamutes
 Boston Pedros
 Baltimore Nordiques
 Utah Rastafarians
 New York Cowboys

The Seventh Game by Roger Kahn
 Binghamton White Sox
 Los Angeles Mastodons
 New York Mohawks
 Pittsfield Eagles
 Waterbury Yankees

The Simpsons
Burlington Drifters
Capital City Capitals ("Dancin' Homer")
Shelbyville Shelbyvillians
Springfield Floozies – AAPGBL team in the 1940s
Springfield Isotopes

Star Trek: Deep Space Nine
 Logicians (All-Vulcan baseball team)
 London Kings
 Niners (command crew of Deep Space Nine)
 Pike City Pioneers

Superman (comic book)
 Metropolis Meteors
 Metropolis Monarchs

Total Recall
 Tokyo Samurai

Universal Baseball Association
Beaneaters
Bridegrooms
Excelsiors
Haymakers
Keystones
Knickerbockers
Pastime Club
Pioneers

Basketball teams

 Archers- UBA team in Juwanna Mann
 Atomic Supermen – Futurama
 Basin City Blues – Sin City (film)
 Branford City Eagles - Branford City
 Cascade Jaguars – The Sentinel (TV series)
 Charlotte Banshees – women's team in Juwanna Mann
 Charlotte Beat - UBA team in Juwanna Mann
 Deon Demons – team owned by Larry Deon in seaQuest 2032
 Detroit Gears – Detroit: Become Human
 Hickory High School Huskers – Hoosiers
 Los Angeles Diablos – Bedazzled (2000 film)
 Los Angeles Knights – Like Mike
 Liberty Tigers - 13 Reasons Why
 Metropolis Generals – Superman (comic book)
 Oregon Slam Dunkers- Gravity Falls
 Philadelphia Spartans –  Warehouse 13
 Pittsburgh Pythons/Pisces – The Fish that Saved Pittsburgh
 Richmond Oilers - Coach Carter
 Western University Dolphins – Blue Chips

American Basketball Association
 Flint Tropics - Semi-Pro
 Roswell Rayguns – Nike TV commercial

Batman
 Gotham Guardsmen (comic book)
 Gotham Gators – The Batman (TV series)

Dick Vitale's "Awesome, Baby!" College Hoops
Los Angeles Rockets (California)
Las Vegas Angels (Nevada)
Hawaii Roadrunners (Hawaii)
Phoenix Jets (Arizona)
New Mexico Jaguars (New Mexico)
Alaska Panthers (Alaska)
Seattle Space Ants (Washington)
Portland Koalas (Oregon)
Utah Cupids (Utah)
Montana Owls (Montana)
North Dakota Kiwis (North Dakota)
South Dakota Iguanas (South Dakota)
Wyoming Chihuahuas (Wyoming)
Boise Kangaroos (Idaho)
Denver Samurais (Colorado)
Minnesota Spiders (Minnesota)
Dallas Tigers (Texas)
Memphis Kabukis (Tennessee)
Oklahoma City Tumbleweeds (Oklahoma)
New Orleans Albatrosses (Louisiana)
Arkansas Atoms (Arkansas)
Jackson Bengals (Mississippi)
Chicago Scorpions (Illinois)
Detroit Pharaohs (Michigan)
Lincoln Louds (Nebraska)
Kansas Anteaters (Kansas)
Indiana Monkeys (Indiana)
Kentucky Fried Chickens (Kentucky)
St. Louis Giants (Missouri)
Milwaukee Dolphins (Wisconsin)
Iowa Coyotes (Iowa)
West Virginia Ostriches (West Virginia)
Cleveland Crocodiles (Ohio)
Charleston Wyverns (South Carolina)
Charlotte Dragons (North Carolina)
Atlanta Clock Mice (Georgia)
Alabama Astrobees (Alabama)
Virginia Powergorillas (Virginia)
Miami Piranhas (Florida)
Philadelphia Chipmunks (Pennsylvania)
Maine Cheetahs (Maine)
Vermont Storm (Vermont)
Hartford Machine (Connecticut)
New Hampshire Molemen (New Hampshire)
Rhode Island Tritons (Rhode Island)
Delaware Walruses (Delaware)
Washington Strikers (Baltimore, Maryland/Washington D.C.)
New York Stars (New York)
New Jersey Phantoms (New Jersey)
Boston Tea Parties (Massachusetts)

Grand Theft Auto
 Liberty City Penetrators – Grand Theft Auto IV
 Liberty City Warriors – Grand Theft Auto IV
 Los Santos Saints – Grand Theft Auto: San Andreas
 Los Santos Panic – Grand Theft Auto V
 Liberty City Salamanders – Grand Theft Auto IV
 Los Santos Shrimps – Grand Theft Auto V

Harlem Globetrotters: World Tour
Los Angeles Lashers
London Lords
Shanghai Stars
Mexico City Masters
Berlin Ballers
Oslo Turbos
Sydney Slayers
Paris Destroyers
Johannesburg Dragons 
Athens Avengers
Moscow Flames
Rio Redeemers
Tokyo Tornados
Vegas Daggers
New York City Attackers

He's Into Her
 Benison Bears
 Southbay Sharks

The Loud House
 Abscessed Molars 
 Belching Ballers
 Brie Throwers 
 Garlic Nets
 Turkey Jerkies

One Tree Hill (TV series)
 Gilmore College Cobras
 Tree Hill High School Ravens
the Scotts

Pinky and the Brain
 Solvang CobbleCloggers
 Fresno Butternuggets
 Chicago Bills
 Supertonics
 Kazz
 Tragic
 Cobber Kippers

The Simpsons
 Austin Celtics ("The Burns and the Bees")
 Springfield Celtics/Excitement ("The Burns and the Bees")

Space Jam
 Monstars
 Tune Squad

Space Jam: A New Legacy
 Goon Squad

The Fairly OddParents
 Dimmsdale Ballhogs
 Pittsburgh Earthtrotters
 45ers

Aeroball teams
Aeroball is a futuristic version of basketball played with jetpacks in the 2000 AD strip Harlem Heroes.

The Baltimore Bulls
The Berlin Blitzkriegs
The Bushido Blades
The Flying Scotsmen
Gorgon's Gargoyles
The Harlem Heroes
The Montezuma Mashers
The Siberian Wolves
The Teutonic Titans

Cheerleading Squads

 Booker High Cougars – Kids In America
 Bridgeport High Vikings – Prom Night
 Carry Nation High Falcons – Bratz: The Movie
 Devil's Kettle High Devils – Jennifer's Body
 Logan High Spartans – Love Don't Cost A Thing
 North Ojai High Woodchucks – Easy A
 North Shore High Lions – Mean Girls
 Timothy Zonin Tigers – Drive Me Crazy
 West Valley High Vikings – Dirty Deeds

A Cinderella Story

 North Valley High Fighting Frogs
 South Bay High Lancers

Bring It On

 Broncos
 Colorado Springs High Coyotes
 East Compton High Clovers
 Giants
 Muskrats
 New Pope High Cavaliers
 Patriots
 Rancho Carne High Toros
 Saints
 Trojans
 Vikings

Bring It On Again

 Cal State Stingers
 Renegades

Bring It On: All or Nothing

 Crenshaw Heights High Warriors
 Pacific Vista High Pirates

Bring It On: In It to Win It

 Catz
 East Coast High Jets
 Flamingos (Flaming Hoes)
 Prairie Dogs
 Sebrings
 West Coast High Sharks
 East Coast/West Coast Shets

Bring It On: Fight to the Finish

 California High All-Stars
 East LA High Rough Riders
 Glendale High Cougars
 Malibu High Dream Team
 Malibu High Jaguars
 Malibu Vista High Sea Lions

Fired Up!

 Bulldogs
 Dragons
 Eagles
 Gerald R. Ford High Tigers
 Mustangs
 Pandas
 Panthers
 Scorpions

Hellcats
 Lancer University Hellcats
 Memphis Christian College Cyclones

High School Musical

 East High Wildcats
 West High Knights

John Tucker Must Die

 Bobcats
 Eagles
 Forest Hills High Kodiaks
 Giants

Not Another Teen Movie

 John Hughes High Wasps
 North Compton High Wildcats

The Hot Chick

 Bridgetown High Honeybees
 Fenmore High Foxes
 Vikings

The New Guy

 Eastland Heights High Highlanders
 Rocky Creak High Drillers

Croquet teams
All from the Thursday Next novels, in which croquet has been reinvented as a fast-paced contact sport.
Gloucester Meteors
Reading Whackers
Swindon Mallets

Dodgeball teams
All featured in the film Dodgeball: A True Underdog Story
Average Joe's (the protagonist's team)
Globo Gym Purple Cobras
Skillz That Killz
Lumberjacks
Team Blitzkrieg
Osaka Kamikazes
Las Vegas Police Department
Poughkeepsie State Flying Cougars
The Gay Gang
MILFS
Moose Knucklers
New Orleans Clown Punchers
Monterrey Mulchers
She-Mullets
Troop 417
Wedgies
Yetis
Pouncers
Spleen Mashers
Savage Squad 300

American football teams
 Adams College Atoms – Revenge of the Nerds
 Ampipe Bulldogs – All the Right Moves
 Atlanta Cobras – The Game
 Arlen High School Longhorns – King of the Hill
 Arizona Sparklies – The Suite Life on Deck
 Blue Mountain State Goats – Blue Mountain State
 Boston Rebels – The Game Plan (film)
 California Atoms – Gus (film)
 California University Condors – Beverly Hills, 90210
 Cougars – Playmakers
 Denver Monarchs – Dynasty
 Desert Bluff Vultures – Welcome to Night Vale
 Dillon Panthers – Friday Night Lights
 Duluth Bulldogs – Leatherheads
 East Dillon Lions – Friday Night Lights
 Eastern State University Timberwolves – The Program
 Enormous State University Sandcrabs – Tank McNamara
 Faber College Mongols – Animal House
 Franklin State University Warriors – Unbreakable (film)
 Grandview High School Tigers – Ghost Whisperer
 Heartland State University Comebacks – The Comebacks
 Illinois Poly Stallions - Cheaper by the Dozen
 John Hughes High School Wasps – Not Another Teen Movie
 Lancer University Lions - Hellcats
 Langley Falls Bazooka Sharks - Arena Football team, American Dad!
 Lincoln College Cougars - Cheaper by the Dozen
 London Jets – Red Dwarf (zero-G football)
 London Silly Nannies – Family Guy
 Lone Star State Unbeatables –  The Comebacks
 Los Angeles Cougars – The Incredible Hulk (TV series) (Killer Instinct)
 Los Angeles Outlaws – Against All Odds
 Los Angeles Stallions – The Last Boy Scout
 Los Angeles Thunderbirds – Psych
 Marlin Briscoe High School Hawks – Nike TV commercial
 McKinley Titans –  Glee
 Mean Machine – The Longest Yard (1974 film) and The Longest Yard (2005 film)
 Miami Bucks – Semi-Tough
 Nassau Rebels – The King of Queens (Kirbed Enthusiasm)
 New Jersey Blazers – Magnum, P.I. (One More Summer)
 New York Smashers – Kickers, Inc.
 Night Vale Scorpions – Welcome to Night Vale
 North Dallas Bulls – North Dallas Forty
 Park City Pirates – Lucas (film)
 Pittsburgh Ironmen – Queer as Folk (US TV series)
 Polk High School Panthers – Married... with Children
 Quimby Falls Buzzards – Fumbleheads
 Raccoon Sharks – mentioned briefly at the beginning of Resident Evil Outbreak
 Ridgemont Wolves – Fast Times at Ridgemont High
 Roadrunners – The 6th Day
 Royal Woods Roosters - The Loud House (The Loudest Yard)
 Rydell High School Rangers – Grease (film)
 San Diego Sabres – The Game (US TV series)
 San Francisco Miners - Love on the Sidelines (film)
 Santa Barbara Thunderbirds - Psych (US TV Series)
 Seattle Cobras – iCarly
 Texas Angels – The A-Team (Quarterback Sneak)
 Texas State Armadillos – Necessary Roughness (film)
 Texas Pistols – The Franchise (novel) by Peter Gent
 Tom Landry Middle School Longhorns – King of the Hill
 The Turbos-"Starsky and Hutch"
Union Wells High School Wildcats – Heroes
 University of Los Angeles Peacocks – The Fresh Prince of Bel Air
 Urbania Little Giants – Little Giants
 Washington Sentinels – The Replacements (film)
 West Canaan High School Coyotes – Varsity Blues (film)
 Zucchini Warriors – The Zucchini Warriors by Gordon Korman

ABC Monday Night Football
Anaheim Turbo
Atlanta Monsters
Buffalo Cupids
Chicago Surfers
Cincinnati Dragons
Cleveland Warriors
Dallas Swimmers
Denver Snowmen
Detroit Bolts
Green Bay Armor
Houston Bisons
Indianapolis Rays
Kansas City Cyclones
Los Angeles Rockets
Miami Sharks
Minnesota Samurais
New England Cobras
New Jersey Olympians
New Orleans Tritons
New York Stars
Philadelphia Justice
Phoenix Fighters
Pittsburgh Belles
San Diego Spacehawks
San Francisco Honeybees
Seattle Ninjas
Tampa Bay Beasts
Washington Knights

All-Pro Football 2K8
 Arizona Scorpions
 Atlanta Wasps
 Boston Minutemen
 Carolina Cobras
 Chicago Beasts
 Dallas Gunslingers
 Denver Cougars
 Detroit Firebirds
 Los Angeles Legends
 Las Vegas Rollers
 Miami Cyclones
 Milwaukee Indians
 Minneapolis Werewolves
 New Jersey Assassins
 New York Knights
 Ohio Red Dogs
 Philadelphia Americans
 Pittsburgh Iron Men
 San Francisco Sharks
 Seattle Sailors
 St. Louis Rhinos
 Tampa Bay Top Guns
 Texas Rustlers
 Washington Federals

Any Given Sunday
 Albuquerque Aztecs
 California Crusaders
 Chicago Rhinos
 Colorado Blizzard
 Dallas Knights
 Houston Cattlemen
 Kansas Twisters
 Los Angeles Breakers
 Miami Sharks
 Maine Androids
 Minnesota Americans
 New York Emperors
 Oregon Pioneers
 Orlando Crushers
 San Francisco Knights
 Seattle Prospects
 Texas Rattlers
 Washington Lumbermen
 Wisconsin Icemen

Axis Football series

2015-2020
Arizona Redhawks
Atlanta Redbirds
Baltimore Blackbirds
Buffalo Bulls
Carolina Wildcats
Chicago Grizzlies
Cincinnati Prowlers
Cleveland Mud Hounds
Dallas Tigers
Denver Mustangs
Detroit Pumas
Green Bay Cheese
Houston Bisons
Indianapolis Stallions
Jacksonville Bulldogs
Kansas City Warriors
Las Vegas Pillagers
Los Angeles Lightning
Los Angeles Thunder
Miami Orcas
Minnesota Norsemen
New England Volunteers
New Orleans Crusaders
New York Bombers
New York Hulks
Philadelphia Northhawks
Pittsburgh Tin Irons
San Francisco Goldrushers
Seattle Warhawks
Tampa Bay Pirates
Tennessee Beasts
Washington Knights

2021-Present
Arizona Heat
Atlanta Razorbacks
Baltimore Paladins
Boston BaySnakes
Buffalo Cheetahs
Carolina CyberDragons
Chicago Lakehawks
Cincinnati Emperors
Cleveland Coyotes
Dallas Cavaliers
Denver Mountaineers
Detroit Firebirds
Green Bay Axemen
Houston Whales
Indianapolis Gladiators
Jacksonville Astrocrabs
Kansas City Wranglers
Las Vegas Outlaws
Los Angeles Tide
Louisiana Crocodiles
Mexico City Wildcats
Miami Warriors
Minnesota Pride
Montreal Terrapins
Nebraska Thunder
New York Barons
Oakland Indians
Oklahoma City Cyclones
Orlando Bombers
Philadelphia Express
Pittsburgh Ironhawks
San Diego Battlefishes
San Francisco Sharks
Seattle Grizzlies
St. Louis Stallions
Tampa Bay Flyers
Tennessee Bloodhounds
Vancouver Mallards
Washington Senators
Winnipeg Pouncers

Backbreaker
Albuquerque Atoms
Anaheim Thrashers
Anchorage Watchmen
Arizona Assassins
Atlanta Firebirds
Baltimore Cannons
Birmingham Irons
Boston Smugglers
Buffalo Beasts
Carolina Leopards
Charleston Cougars
Charlotte Yellow Jackets
Chicago Talons
Cincinnati Hogs
Cleveland Kings
Colorado Six Shooters
Columbia Colonels
Columbus Blitz
Dallas Spectres
D.C. Law Makers
Denver Outlaws
Detroit Demons
Fresno Wildfires
Green Bay Grizzlies
Honolulu Breakers
Houston Wranglers
Indianapolis Spartans
Jacksonville Amberjacks
Kansas City Blues
Las Vegas Rollers
Little Rock Maulers
Los Angeles Raptors
Miami Thunder
Michigan Tanks
Milwaukee Mariners
Minnesota Mustangs
Nashville Guardians
New England Militia
New Jersey Pirates
New Orleans Settlers
New York Red Tails
Oklahoma Stampede
Oakland Scourge
Omaha Cyclones
Orlando Lightning
Philadelphia Liberty
Phoenix Inferno
Pittsburgh Pioneers
Portland Tomahawks
Salt Lake Wrath
San Antonio Scorpions
San Francisco Tridents
San Jose Coyotes
Seattle Wolves
St. Louis Racers
Tampa Bay Tigers
Tennessee Swarm
Wichita Wildcats

Batman
 Boston Colonials (Batman: The Animated Series, Fear of Victory)
 Gotham Knights (formerly the Gotham Giants, from the comic book)
 Gotham Wildcats (formerly Goliaths, from the comic book)
 Gotham Rogues (The Dark Knight Rises)
 Rapid City Monuments (The Dark Knight Rises)

The Best of Times (1986 film)
 Bakersfield Tigers
 Taft Rockets

Blitz: The League II
Arizona Outlaws
Atlanta 404
Baltimore Bearcats
Carolina Copperheads
Chicago Marauders
Cincinnati Crusaders
Cleveland Steamers (Formerly San Diego Cyclones)
Denver Grizziles
Detroit Devils
Houston Riders
Kansas City Crossfire
Las Vegas Aces
Los Angeles Riot
Mexico City Aztecs (Relocated from Dallas)
Miami Hammerheads (Formerly Orlando Hammerheads)
Milwaukee Hounds
Minnesota Reapers
New England Regulars
New York Nightmares
Philadelphia Brawlers
Seattle Reign
Vancouver Beavers
Washington Redhawks

Coach (TV series)
 Los Angeles Mighty Bucks
 Minnesota State Screaming Eagles
 Orlando Breakers – NFL team
 Southern Texas Wranglers (Minnesota State's bowl opponent in the two-part 1991 episode "The Pineapple Bowl")

Cyberball series

Cyberball (Arcade)
New York Assassins
Tokyo Enforcers
Napoli Hitmen
Taipei Killers
Seoul Terminators
Sydney Destroyers

Cyberball 2072 (Arcade)
USA Crush
Japan Flash
Italian Thunder
Taiwan Machine
Korean Invasion
Aussie Lightning

Cyberball (Genesis)
Buffalo Beasts
Indianapolis Cyborgs
Miami Terminators
New England Constables
New York Enforcers
Cincinnati Blasters
Cleveland Stormers
Houston Spikes
Pittsburgh Bolts
Denver Dominators
Las Vegas Bombers
Los Angeles Assassins
San Diego Conquerors
Seattle Snakes
Boston Riots
Dallas Destroyers
Philadelphia Guns
Phoenix Phantoms
Washington Punishers
Chicago Killers
Detroit Rollers
Minnesota Monsters
St. Louis Fighters
Tampa Bay Razors
Atlanta Dynamix
New Orleans Showdowns
Portland Tornadoes
San Francisco Hitmen

Earth: Final Conflict
 London Royals (Resurrection)
 Los Angeles Quakes (Resurrection)

Eyeshield 21
 Deimon Devil Bats
 NASA Shuttles
 Ojo White Knights
 San Antonio Armadillos (NFL Team)
 Seibu Wild Gunmen
 Shinryūji Naga
 Teikoku Alexanders

1st & Ten (TV series)
 California Bulls
 Chicago Huskies
 Dayton Cougars
 Houston Stallions
 Houston Riggers
 Phoenix Warriors
 Toronto Mustangs
 Other cities mentioned as having teams, but not identified by nickname include Pittsburgh, Buffalo and Miami.

Grand Theft Auto (series)
 San Fierro 69ers – Grand Theft Auto: San Andreas
 Vice City Mambas – Grand Theft Auto: Vice City, Grand Theft Auto Advance
 Liberty City Wrath – Grand Theft Auto IV
 Los Santos Pounders – Grand Theft Auto (series)
 U.C.L.S. Bookworms – Grand Theft Auto V

The Grim Adventures of Billy and Mandy
 Endsville Fluffycats
 Rump City Bootyheads

The Last Boy Scout
 Cleveland Cats
 Los Angeles Stallions

Legend Bowl
Anaheim Superswimmers
Arizona Jungle Dogs
Atlanta Beasts
Baltimore Strikers
Boston Tea Parties
Brooklyn Judos
Buffalo Steel
Carolina Redbirds
Calgary Sounders
California Calvary
Charlotte Photons
Chicago Scorpions
Cincinnati Mutants
Cleveland Crocodiles
Colorado Rush
Dallas Tigers
Denver Samurais
Detroit Prowlers
Edmonton Volunteers
Florida Attackers
Golden State Orions
Green Bay Beavers
Hartford Machine
Honolulu Roadrunners
Houston Stallions
Indianapolis Drivers
Jacksonville Storm
Kansas City Coyotes
Las Vegas Gunners
Los Angeles Rockets
Memphis Crush
Miami Longhorns
Milwaukee Lasers
Minnesota Walleyes
Montreal Blades
Nashville Flash
New England Minutemen
New Jersey Phantoms
New Orleans Crayfish
New York Stars
Oakland Dragonflies
Oklahoma City Taekwondos
Orlando Battlers
Ottawa Orcas
Philadelphia Freedom
Phoenix Bolts
Pittsburgh Belles
Portland Reign
Quebec Thunder
Sacramento Astro Mice
St. Louis Ostriches
San Antonio Hippos
San Diego Impalas
San Francisco Honeybees
San Jose Karate Cats
Seattle Space Ants
Tampa Bay Armadillos
Tennessee Grizzlies
Texas Cheetahs
Toronto Targets
Utah Rhinos
Vancouver Invasion
Washington KnightHawks
Winnipeg Lightning

Madden NFL Series relocation teams 
Austin, Texas (Teams: Austin Armadillos, Bats and Desperados)
Barcelona, Spain (Team: Barcelona Bisons, Bullfighters, and Dragons)
Brooklyn, New York (Teams: Brooklyn Barons, Beats, Bulls, Dodgers, Yanks)
Chicago, Illinois (Teams: Chicago Blues, Cougars and Tigers)
Columbus, Ohio (Teams: Columbus Aviators, Caps, Explorers, and Panhandles)
Dublin, Ireland (Teams: Dublin Antlers, Celtic Tigers, Derbies and Shamrocks)
Houston, Texas (Teams: Houston Gunners, Oilers and Voyagers)
London, England (Teams: London Black Knights, Bulldogs and Monarchs)
Los Angeles, California (Teams: Los Angeles All-Stars, Dreams, and Rockets)
Memphis, Tennessee (Teams: Memphis Egyptians, Hounds, Showboats and Steamers)
Mexico City, Mexico (Teams: Mexico City Conquistadors, Diablos and Golden Eagles)
Oakland, California (Teams: Oakland Kabukis, Ninjas, and Samurais)
Oklahoma City, Oklahoma (Teams: Oklahoma City Blazers, Lancers, and Night Hawks)
Orlando, Florida (Teams: Orlando Orbits, Sentinels and Wizards)
Portland, Oregon (Teams: Portland Lumberjacks, River Hogs and Snowhawks)
Sacramento, California (Teams: Sacramento Condors, Miners and Redwoods)
Salt Lake City, Utah (Teams: Salt Lake City Elks, Flyers and Pioneers)
San Antonio, Texas (Teams: San Antonio Dreadnoughts, Express, Marshalls)
San Diego, California (Teams: San Diego Aftershocks, Crusaders and Red Beasts)
St. Louis, Missouri (Teams: Indians, Tomahawks, and Warriors)
Toronto, Canada (Teams: Toronto Huskies, Mounties and Thunderbirds)

Monk
 California Wildcats ("Mr. Monk Makes the Playoffs")
 San Francisco Condors ("Mr. Monk Makes the Playoffs")

Mutant Football League
 Blitzburg Steelheads
 Brainwashington Cadavers
 Brawltimore Razors 
 Cardinal Sins
 Cracksumskull Jugulars
 Diami Krakens
 Deadlanta Vultures
 Full Metal Mayhem
 Galaxy Chaos
 Gnashville Lycans
 Grim Bay Attackers
 Hexxon Oilers
 Insane Cults
 Karcass City Creeps
 Killadelphia Evils
 Leaveland Burns
 Los Scandalous Damned
 Los Scandalous Volts
 Lost Wages Invaders (formerly Croakland Invaders)
 Malice Hellboys
 Microhard Mutilators
 Midway Mutants
 Mile High Chronic
 Motor City Maniacs
 New Goreleans Zombies
 New Yuck Threats
 New Yuck Tyrants
 Nuked London Hatriots
 Orcs of Hazzard
 Purple Mutant Eaters
 Scarolina Panzers
 Sin Fransicko Forty Nightmares
 Sinsonasty Mangles
 Snuffalo Thrills
 Terror Bay Mutantneers
 Tokyo Terminators

Necessary Roughness
 New York Hawks
 New Jersey Bobcats

North Dallas Forty 
 North Dallas Bulls
 Chicago Marauders
 Seattle Demons

The PJs
 San Francisco Treat ("Parole Officer and a Gentleman")
 Tri City Nuance ("Parole Officer and a Gentleman")

The Replacements (film) 
 Washington Sentinels
 Dallas Ropers
 San Diego Stallions
 Phoenix Scorpions
 Detroit Ironmen

Smallville (TV series)
 Metropolis Sharks
 Metropolis University Bulldogs
 Smallville Crows

The Simpsons
 San Antonio Cow Skulls ("Homer and Ned's Hail Mary Pass")
 Shelbyville Sharks ("Homer Loves Flanders")
 Springfield A&M University Snortin' Swine ("Faith Off", "Homer Goes to College")
 Springfield Atoms ("Homer Loves Flanders")
 Springfield Meltdowns ("Million Dollar Abie")
 Springfield University Nittany Tide ("Faith Off", "Homer Goes to College")
 Springfield Wildcats ("Bart Star")
 Boston Americans ("The Town'")

Spider-Man
 New York Mammoths – The Amazing Spider-Man (Vol. 1 #253)
 San Francisco Skyhawks – The Amazing Spider-Man (Vol. 1 #253)

South Park
 South Park Cows
 Toronto Roughriders (Canadian football)
 Vancouver Roughriders (Canadian football)

Superman
 Metropolis Meteors
 Metropolis Metros

The Waterboy
 South Central Louisiana State University Mud Dogs
 University of Louisiana Cougars

Deathball teams
 Greenwood Grendels (The Hero by John Ringo and Michael Z. Williamson, p. 64)

Association football teams
AFC Richmond – Ted Lasso
Ashton Athletic – Horrid Henry
Aston Wanderers – Yes Minister
Barnstoneworth United – Ripping Yarns
Belfast United – Mad About Mambo
Big Green – The Big Green
Bio Zombie F.C. – Bio Zombie
Brentwich United – United!
BK Daggen – Håkan Bråkan
Buggleskelly Thursday – Oh, Mr Porter!
Böljas BK – Bert Diaries (Berts vidare betraktelser)
Brasil – Football Days
Cuervos de Nuevo Toledo – Club de Cuervos
Dedfield School – Thunderbolt and Smokey!
Deportivo Cristal – Botineras
Divino Futebol Clube – Avenida Brasil
Earls Park F.C. – Footballers' Wives
Eastwich United – When I Grow Up, I'll Be a Kangaroo
Estrella Polar – The Longest Penalty Shot in the World
F.C. De Kampioenen – FC De Kampioenen
Fulchester United – Viz (comic)
Galatians – Max Payne 3
Glipton Grasshoppers/Glipton Giants – Jossy's Giants
Harchester United F.C. – Dream Team (TV series)
Heroes F.C. – Voetbalvrouwen
Hounslow Harriers – Bend It Like Beckham
Illyria Armadillos - She's the Man
Klapzuba's Eleven – Klapzuba's Eleven by Eduard Bass
Langley Falls Bazooka Sharks - American Dad!
Mean Machine – Mean Machine (film)
Melchester Rovers – Roy of the Rovers
Montreal Thunder – 21 Thunder
Neasden United F.C. – Private Eye
Naboombu Dirty Yellows and True Blues – Bedknobs and Broomsticks
 Pelotillehue Unido – Condorito
 Red-Blooded Eleven Akaki Chi no Eleven
 Royal Woods Kangaroos - The Loud House (Hero Today, Gone Tomorrow)
 Steeple Sinderby Wanderers - How Steeple Sinderby Wanderers Won the F.A. Cup
 Stratford East F.C. – Ark Angel
 Tabajara Futebol Clube – Casseta & Planeta
The Hurricanes – Hurricanes (TV series)
Tolcaster F.C. – Scorer in Daily Mirror
 Vila Xurupita Futebol Clube – Zé Carioca Comic Books
Warbury Warriors – Striker (comic)
Weatherfield County – Coronation Street
Walford Town – EastEnders
Wirral County – Mike Bassett: Manager
Åshöjdens BK – Max Lundgren
Öreskogakamraternas idrottsförening – Bert Diaries (Bert och brorsorna)

Grand Theft Auto (series)
 Liberty City Beavers – Grand Theft Auto III
 Liberty City Cocks – Grand Theft Auto III
 Red Mist XI – Grand Theft Auto IV
 Los Santos Benders – Grand Theft Auto (series)
 Los Santos Jardineros – Grand Theft Auto V

ID
Shadwell Town
Wapping FC

Renford Rejects
Renford Rejects
Renford Razors
Slice Girls

Rudo y Cursi
 Atlético Nopaleros
 Deportivo Amaranto

Shaolin Soccer
Team Evil
Team Shaolin

A Touch of Frost (TV series)
Denton Athletic
Denton F.C.

Ice hockey teams
 Dog River Riverdogs – Corner Gas
 Fog Horns – Inside Out (2015 film)
 Gotham Blades – Batman (comic book)
 Hamilton Steelheads – Power Play (TV series)
 Hamilton Mustangs — Youngblood (1986 film)
 Keystone City Combines – Flash (comics)
 Lansing Ice Wolves – Tooth Fairy
 Metropolis Mammoths – NHL team, Superman (comic book)
 Miami Blades – Dexter (Popping Cherry)
 The Mighty Ducks
 Mustangs – MVP (TV series)
 Mystery Eskimos – Mystery, Alaska
 Opal City Corsairs – Starman
 Öreskoga ishockeyklubb – Bert Diaries (Berts ytterligare betraktelser)
 Royal Woods Jellyfish - The Loud House (On Thin Ice)
 Stonewood Saints – The Dog River Riverdogs' opponents in the Corner Gas first-season episode "Face Off"
 Tokyo Katanas  
 Walla Walla Wombats – "3000 Miles to Graceland"

Bon Cop, Bad Cop
(all in the CHL)
 Montreal Patriotes
 Quebec Fleur-de-Lys
 Toronto Loyalists

Bones
 Fed Cases ("Fire in the Ic"')
 Firedawgs ("Fire in the Ice")

Goon (2011 Canadian film)
 Halifax Highlanders
 St. John's Shamrocks
 Quebec Victoires
 Albany Patriots
 Orangetown Assassins
 Windsor Wheelers
Concorde Minutemen
 Hamilton Steelers
 Lovell Kings
 Moncton Lords
 Boston Blackjacks
 Montreal Corsairs
 Reading Wolfdogs
 McBain Highwaymen
 Newark Stallions

Grand Theft Auto
 Liberty City Rampage – Grand Theft Auto IV
 Dust Devils – Grand Theft Auto V
 Los Santos Kings – Grand Theft Auto V
 Los Santos Slappers – Grand Theft Auto: San Andreas

H.E. Double Hockey Sticks
 Annapolis Angels
 Delaware Demons

Lance et compte
 Chicoutimi Saints
 Prince Albert Comets
 Quebec City National
 Trois-Rivières Dragons

The Simpsons
 Kwik-E-Mart Gougers (Lisa on Ice)
 Mighty Pigs (Lisa on Ice)
 Springfield Ice-o-topes (Helter Shelter)

Slap Shot (film)
 Charlestown Chiefs
 Long Island Ducks
 Syracuse Bulldogs
 Peterborough Patriots
 Lancaster Gears
 Hyannisport Presidents
 Broome County Blades

South Park
(Pee-Wee Hockey Teams)
 Adams County (Stanley's Cup)
 Denver County (Stanley's Cup)
 Park County (Stanley's Cup)

What's with Andy?
 East Gackle Cheapskates
 Moosehoof Stick Handlers

Youngblood (1986 film)
 Hamilton Mustangs
 Thunder Bay Bombers
 Toronto Marlboros

Zack and Miri Make a Porno
Monroeville Zombies

Letterkenny
 Letterkenny Irish
 Letterkenny Shamrocks
 Letterkenny Shamrockettes
 Kerry County Eagles

Shoresy
 Sudbury Blueberry Bulldogs
 Sault Ste. Marie Cyclones
 North Bay Norsemen
 Timmins Timber Kings

Jump-rope (Double Dutch) Teams

Jump In
 Dutch Dragons
 Hot Chilli Steppers
 Jive Js
 Joy Jumpers
 Jump Masters
 Kung Fu Flyers
 Sunset Skippers

Motocross Teams

Motocrossed
 Art Henderson Racing
 Carson Racing

Quidditch, a game in the Harry Potter books
 See List of Quidditch teams

Rugby Union teams

The Art of Coarse Rugby by Michael Green
Bagford Vipers B
Old Rottinghamians Extra B

In From The Side by Matt Carter
South London Stags (now a real club)

Rugby League teams

Footy Legends by Paul Byrnes
 Yagoona Schooners

Lacrosse Teams

Futari wa Pretty Cure
Verone Academy

Invisible Sister
Carrollton Owls

Wild Child

 Abbey Mount.
 Bodley Manor.
 Oxley.
 Stowe.

Baccer Teams (fictional Pokémon sport)

 Coronet Fighters
 Jubilife Reds
 Cianwood Greens
 Nimbasa Legends

Unspecified Sports

Grand Theft Auto

 Carcer City Unicorns – Grand Theft Auto IV
 San Andreas Magnetics – Grand Theft Auto V

See also
List of fictional sports

Notes

External links
Fictional sports teams from books, television, and movies

Sports teams